Yeo Myung-Yong (born 11 June 1987) is a South Korean footballer who plays as goalkeeper for Goyang Hi FC in K League Challenge.

Career
Yeo joined Busan TC after graduating from Hanyang University.

He was selected by Goyang Hi FC in the 2013 K League draft and made his first appearance for Goyang in the league match on 23 March.

References

External links 

1987 births
Living people
Association football goalkeepers
South Korean footballers
Goyang Zaicro FC players
Korea National League players
K League 2 players
Hanyang University alumni
Place of birth missing (living people)